= Harry Obst =

- Occupation: Interpreter
- Years active: 1965-1997
- Known for: White House interpreter

Harry Obst is an interpreter who worked for the U.S. government interpreting for seven consecutive presidents until 1997. He was born in East Prussia but spent his teenage years in Saxony as a refugee, learning English with the only texts he could find: a small dictionary and eight copies of the Ladies' Home Journal. He started university in 1954 at Mainz with a major in translation and moved to the United States in 1956.

Beginning in 1965, Obst interpreted for Presidents Johnson, Nixon, Ford, Carter, Reagan, George H. W. Bush and Clinton and acted as director of the Office of Language Service at the Department of State until his retirement in 1997. From then on, he was the director and principal instructor of the Inlingua School of Interpretation until 2004.

He was awarded the Grand Decoration of Merit by the President of Austria in 1972. He wrote a book on his experiences as an interpreter entitled White House Interpreter: The Art of Interpretation.

Obst has been an advocate for university training of interpreters. In his memoirs, he wrote that "“accurate interpretation is no less sophisticated, complex, and intellectually demanding than brain surgery.”
